Kafr Halab (also spelled Kafar Halab) or Kafr Aleppo is a town in northern Syria, administratively part of the Atarib District of the Aleppo Governorate, located southwest of Aleppo. Nearby localities include Zardana to the west, Kafr Nuran, al-Jinah and Ibbin Samaan to the northwest, Urum al-Sughra to the north, al-Bawabiya to the south and Maarrat al-Ikhwan and Taftanaz to the southwest. According to the Syria Central Bureau of Statistics (CBS), Kafr Halab had a population of 4,136 in the 2004 census.

Kafr Halab was visited by Syrian geographer Yaqut al-Hamawi in the early 13th-century during Ayyubid rule. He described it as "a village belonging to Aleppo [Halab]."

References

Bibliography

Populated places in Atarib District